Phtheochroides is a genus of moths belonging to the family Tortricidae.

Species
Phtheochroides apicana (Walsingham, 1900)
Phtheochroides clandestina Razowski, 1968

See also
List of Tortricidae genera

References

 , 1943: Lepidoptera of the Pamir Expedition of the Zoological Museum of the University of Kiev. III. Tortricidae. Mitteilungen der Münchner Entomologischen Gesellschaft 33: 85-108 (94).

External links
tortricidae.com

Cochylini
Tortricidae genera